InfoWars is an American far-right conspiracy theory and fake news website owned by Alex Jones. It was founded in 1999, and operates under Free Speech Systems LLC.

Talk shows and other content for the site are created primarily in studios at an undisclosed location in an industrial area in the outskirts of Austin, Texas. Reports in 2017 stated that the InfoWars website received approximately 10 million monthly visits, making its reach greater than some mainstream news websites such as The Economist and Newsweek at the time.

The site has regularly published fake stories which have been linked to harassment of victims. In February 2018, Jones, the publisher, director and owner of InfoWars, was accused of discrimination and sexually harassing employees. InfoWars, and in particular Jones, advocate numerous conspiracy theories, particularly around purported domestic false flag operations by the U.S. government (which they allege include the 9/11 attacks and Sandy Hook shootings). InfoWars has issued retractions various times as a result of legal challenges. Jones has had contentious material removed, and has also been suspended and banned from many platforms for violating their terms of service, including Facebook, Twitter, YouTube, iTunes, and Roku.

InfoWars earns revenue from the sale of products pitched by Jones during the show, including dietary supplements. It has been called as much "an online store that uses Mr. Jones's commentary to move merchandise" as a media outlet.

On July 30, 2022, amidst a $150 million lawsuit brought against Jones and InfoWars by Sandy Hook families, Free Speech Systems filed for Chapter 11 bankruptcy protection.

History

InfoWars was created in 1999 by American conspiracy theorist Alex Jones, who remains its controlling influence. InfoWars features The Alex Jones Show on their broadcasts and was established as a public-access television program aired in Austin, Texas in 1999.

During the 2016 presidential election, the website was promoted by bots connected to the Russian government. A 2017 study by the Berkman Klein Center for Internet & Society at Harvard University found that InfoWars was the 13th most shared source by supporters of Donald Trump on Twitter during the election.

In 2016, Paul Joseph Watson was hired as editor-at-large. In February 2017, political commentator Jerome Corsi was hired as Washington bureau chief, after InfoWars was granted a White House day pass. In June 2018, Corsi's connection to InfoWars ended; he received six months of severance payments.

In May 2017, Mike Cernovich joined the InfoWars team as a scheduled guest host for The Alex Jones Show, with CNN reporting the "elevation to InfoWars host represents the meteoric rise in his profile". On July 6, 2017, alongside Paul Joseph Watson, Jones began hosting a contest to create the best "CNN Meme", for which the winner would receive $20,000. They were responding to CNN reporting on a Reddit user who had created a pro-Trump, anti-CNN meme.

In June 2017, it was announced that Roger Stone, a former campaign advisor for Donald Trump, would be hosting his own InfoWars show "five nights a week", with an extra studio being built to accommodate his show.

In March 2018, a number of major brands in the U.S. suspended their ads from InfoWarss YouTube channels, after CNN notified them that their ads were running adjacent to InfoWars content.

In July 2018, YouTube removed four of InfoWarss uploaded videos that violated its policy against hate speech and suspended posts for 90 days. Facebook also banned Jones after it determined four videos on his pages violated its community standards in July 2018. In August 2018, YouTube, Apple and Facebook removed content from Jones and InfoWars, citing their policies against hate speech and harassment.

In an October 2018 Simmons Research survey of 38 news organizations, InfoWars was ranked the second least trusted news organization by Americans, with The Daily Caller being lower-ranked.

On March 12, 2020, Attorney General of New York Letitia James issued a cease and desist letter to Jones concerning InfoWarss sale of unapproved products that the website falsely asserted to be government-approved treatments for coronavirus disease 2019 (COVID-19). On April 9, the FDA ordered InfoWars to discontinue the sale of a number of products marketed as remedies for COVID-19 in violation of the Federal Food, Drug, and Cosmetic Act, including toothpaste, liquids, and gels containing colloidal silver.

Claims of sexual harassment and antisemitism
In February 2018, Jones was accused by two former employees of antisemitism, anti-black racism and sexual harassment of both male and female staff members. He denied the allegations. InfoWars, Haaretz reported in 2017, had accused Israel of involvement in the 9/11 attacks, accused the Rothschilds of the promotion of "endless war, debt slavery and a Luciferian agenda" and US health-care of being under the control of a "Jewish mafia."

Two former employees filed complaints against Jones with the Equal Employment Opportunity Commission.

Removals from other websites

On July 27, 2018, Facebook suspended Alex Jones's official page for thirty days, claiming Jones had participated in hate speech against Robert Mueller. This was swiftly followed by action from other bodies—on August 6, Facebook, Apple, YouTube and Spotify all removed content by Alex Jones and InfoWars from their platforms for violating their policies. YouTube removed channels associated with Infowars, including The Alex Jones Channel, which had gained 2.4 million subscriptions prior to its removal. On Facebook, four pages associated with InfoWars and Alex Jones were removed due to repeated violations of the website's policies. Apple removed all podcasts associated with Jones from its iTunes platform and its podcast app. On August 13, Vimeo removed all Jones's videos because they "violated our terms of service prohibitions on discriminatory and hateful content". By February 2019, a total of 89 pages associated with InfoWars or Alex Jones had been removed from Facebook due to its recidivism policy, which is designed to prevent circumventing a ban. In May 2019, President Donald Trump tweeted or retweeted defenses of people associated with InfoWars, including editor Paul Joseph Watson and host Alex Jones, after the Facebook ban.

Jones's accounts have also been removed from Pinterest, Mailchimp and LinkedIn. As of early August, Jones still had active accounts on Instagram and Twitter. Twitter, however, ultimately decided to permanently deactivate Jones's account as well as the InfoWars account in September 2018. The Wikipedia community deprecated and blacklisted InfoWars as a source by snowball clause consensus in 2018; the community determined that InfoWars is a "conspiracy theorist and fake news website".

Jones had tweeted a Periscope video calling on others "to get their battle rifles ready against antifa, the mainstream media, and Chicom operatives". In the video he also says, "Now is time to act on the enemy before they do a false flag." Twitter cited this as the reason to suspend his account for a week on August 14. On September 6, Twitter permanently banned InfoWars and Alex Jones for repeated violations of the site's terms and conditions. Twitter cited abusive behavior, namely a video that "shows Jones shouting at and berating CNN journalist Oliver Darcy for some 10 minutes during congressional hearings about social media."

On September 7, 2018, the InfoWars app was removed from the Apple App Store. On September 20, 2018, PayPal informed InfoWars they would cease processing payments in ten days because "promotion of hate and discrimination runs counter to our core value of inclusion." On May 2, 2019, Facebook and Instagram banned Jones and InfoWars as part of a larger ban of far-right extremists. The ban covered videos, audio clips, and articles from InfoWars, but excluded criticism of InfoWars. Facebook indicated it would take down groups that violated the ban. The InfoWars app was pulled from Google Play on March 27, 2020, for violating its policies on spreading "misleading or harmful disinformation", after Jones opposed efforts to contain COVID-19 and said "natural antivirals" could treat the disease.

Content

Promotion of conspiracy theories and fake news

InfoWars disseminates multiple conspiracy theories, including false claims against the HPV vaccine and claims the 2017 Las Vegas shooting was part of a conspiracy. In 2015 skeptic Brian Dunning listed it a #4 on a "Top 10 Worst Anti-Science Websites" list.

InfoWars advocates New World Order conspiracy theories, 9/11 conspiracy theories, the chemtrail conspiracy theory, conspiracy theories involving Bill Gates, supposed covert government weather control programs, claims of rampant domestic false flag operations by the US Government (including 9/11), and the unsupported claim that millions voted illegally in the 2016 US presidential election. Jones frequently uses InfoWars to assert that mass shootings are conspiracies or "false flag" operations; these false claims are often subsequently spread by other fake news outlets and on social media. This has been characterized as Second Amendment "fan fiction".

Infowars has published and promoted fake news, and Jones has been accused of knowingly misleading people to make money. In the summer of 2015, video editor Josh Owens and reporter Joe Biggs took a video of workers loading cargo in Texas. They claimed the men were drug smugglers; the Drudge Report picked up their headline, and Donald Trump used it in a campaign speech. Owens admitted years later: "It's not about truth, it's not about accuracy — it's about what's going to make people click on this video...In essence, we lied." (Biggs was later indicted for seditious conspiracy for his role with the Proud Boys in the January 6, 2021 attack on the Capitol.) As part of the probe by the Federal Bureau of Investigation (FBI) into Russian interference in the 2016 United States elections, InfoWars was investigated to see if it was complicit in the dissemination of fake news stories distributed by Russian bots.

From May 2014 to November 2017, InfoWars republished articles from multiple sources without permission, including over 1,000 from Russian state-sponsored news network RT, as well as stories from news outlets such as CNN, the BBC, and The New York Times which Salon said were "dwarfed" by those from RT.

A 2020 study by researchers from Northeastern, Harvard, Northwestern and Rutgers universities found that InfoWars was among the top 5 most shared fake news domains in tweets related to COVID-19, the others being The Gateway Pundit, WorldNetDaily, Judicial Watch and Natural News.

Claims of false flag school shootings

InfoWars has regularly claimed, without evidence, that mass shootings have been staged "false flag" operations and has accused survivors of such events of being crisis actors employed by the United States government. InfoWars host Alex Jones promoted the Sandy Hook Elementary School shooting conspiracy theories, claiming that the massacre of twenty elementary school students and six staff members was "completely fake" and "manufactured," a stance for which Jones was heavily criticized.  In March 2018, six families of victims of the Sandy Hook Elementary School shooting, as well as an FBI agent who responded to the attack, filed a defamation lawsuit against Jones for his role in spreading conspiracy theories about the shooting. In December 2019, InfoWars and Jones were ordered to pay $100,000 in legal fees prior to the trial for another defamation lawsuit from a different family whose son was killed in the shooting. In a June 2022 agreement, the families will drop their Texas and Connecticut defamation cases against Infowars, Prison Planet TV and IW Health, and in return, those companies will no longer pursue their Texas case for bankruptcy protection. The families may continue to pursue defamation cases against Alex Jones and Free Speech Systems.

Jones has also accused David Hogg and other survivors of the Stoneman Douglas High School shooting of being crisis actors.

Pizzagate conspiracy theory

InfoWars promoted fabricated Pizzagate claims. The fake claims led to harassment of the owner and employees of Comet Ping Pong, a Washington, D.C. pizzeria targeted by the conspiracy theories, including threatening phone calls, online harassment, and death threats. The owner sent a letter to Jones in February 2017 demanding a retraction or apology. (Such a letter is required before a party may seek punitive damages in an action for libel under Texas law).

After receiving the letter, Jones said, "I want our viewers and listeners to know that we regret any negative impact our commentaries may have had on Mr. Alefantis, Comet Ping Pong, or its employees. We apologize to the extent our commentaries could be construed as negative statements about Mr. Alefantis or Comet Ping Pong, and we hope that anyone else involved in commenting on Pizzagate will do the same thing." InfoWars also issued a correction on its website.

InfoWars reporter Owen Shroyer also targeted East Side Pies, a group of pizza restaurants in Austin, Texas, with similar fake "Pizzagate" claims. Following the claims, the pizza business was targeted by phone threats, vandalism, and harassment, which the co-owners called "alarming, disappointing, disconcerting and scary".

Chobani retraction

In 2017, InfoWars (along with similar sites) published a fake story about U.S. yogurt manufacturer Chobani, with headlines including "Idaho yogurt maker caught importing migrant rapists" and "allegations that Chobani's practice of hiring refugees brought crime and tuberculosis to Twin Falls". Chobani ultimately filed a federal lawsuit against Jones, which led to a settlement on confidential terms in May 2017. Jones offered an apology and retraction, admitting he had made "certain statements" on InfoWars "that I now understand to be wrong".

Businesses

While Jones has stated, "I'm not a business guy, I'm a revolutionary", he spends much of InfoWarss air time pitching dietary supplements and survivalist products to his audience. As a private firm, InfoWars and its affiliated limited liability companies are not required to make public financial statements; as a result, observers can only estimate its revenue and profits.

Prior to 2013, Jones focused on building a "media empire". By 2013, Alex Seitz-Wald of Salon estimated that Jones was earning as much as $10 million a year between subscriptions, web and radio advertising, and sales of DVDs, T-shirts, and other merchandise. That year, Jones changed his business model to incorporate selling proprietary dietary supplements, including one that promised to "supercharge" cognitive functions.

Unlike most talk radio shows, InfoWars itself does not directly generate income. It gets no syndication fees from its syndicater GCN, no cut of the advertising that GCN sells, and it does not sell its three minutes per hour of national advertising time. The show no longer promotes its video service (though it still exists), and has not made any documentary films since 2012. Virtually all money is made by selling Jones's dietary supplements to viewers and listeners through the site's online store.

In 2017, the supplements sold on the InfoWars store were primarily sourced from Dr. Edward F. Group III, a chiropractor who founded the Global Healing Center supplement vendor. A significant portion of InfoWarss products contain colloidal silver, which Jones falsely claimed "kills every virus", including "the whole SARS-corona family"; this claim was disputed by the Food and Drug Administration (FDA).

A lesser source of revenue for InfoWars is its "money bomb" telethons, which resemble public radio fundraisers, except InfoWars is a for-profit institution. According to former InfoWars employees, a money bomb was able to raise $100,000 in a day.

In 2014, Jones claimed that InfoWars was accumulating over $20 million in annual revenue. The New York Times attributed most of the revenue to sales of supplements, including "Super Male Vitality" and "Brain Force Plus," which InfoWars purported would increase testosterone and mental agility, respectively. Court documents in 2014 indicate that InfoWars was successful enough for Jones and his then-wife to be planning to "build a swimming pool complex... featuring a waterfall and dining cabana with a stone fireplace". The documents also listed Jones's possessions, including four Rolex watches, a $40,000 saltwater aquarium, a $70,000 grand piano, $50,000 in weapons, and $70,000 in jewelry.

After InfoWars was banned by Facebook, YouTube, Apple, Spotify, and Pinterest, Jones appealed to viewers, "The enemy wants to cut off our funding to destroy us. If you don't fund us, we'll be shut down."

Chapter 11 bankruptcy protection
In April 2022, it became known the company behind InfoWars had filed for Chapter 11 bankruptcy protection, as had Infowars Health (or IWHealth), against further civil litigation lawsuits. The court filings estimated InfoWars assets at between $0–$50,000, but its liabilities (including from the damages awarded against Jones in defamation suits) was estimated as being between $1 million to $10 million.

Hosts

Alex Jones

Alex Jones is the main host and operator of InfoWars.

Owen Shroyer

Owen Shroyer (born 1989) is an American political activist and commentator from St. Louis who now lives and works in Texas. He is considered to be part of the US alt-right movement.

Shroyer previously worked as an AM radio host in St. Louis on KXFN and later KFNS. He began hosting a podcast and posting YouTube videos of his views. Shroyer has been quoted as supporting conspiracy theories about the Clinton family.

On August 20, 2021, Shroyer was charged with illegally entering a restricted area and disorderly conduct during the 2021 United States Capitol attack. He announced on InfoWars that there was a warrant for his arrest and that he would fight the charges.

See also
 List of fake news websites
 Fake news websites in the United States
 Knowledge Fight

References

External links

 

Alex Jones
Websites with far-right material
Conspiracist media
Internet properties established in 1999
Companies that filed for Chapter 11 bankruptcy in 2022
Fake news websites
American conservative websites
Mass media in Austin, Texas
1999 establishments in the United States